Asperoteuthis nesisi is a chiroteuthid squid of the genus Asperoteuthis. It is native to the waters off South Georgia and, more generally, the Southwest Atlantic. Asperoteuthis nesisi has a thin mantle and arms, and peculiar integumental tubercles on its head and mantle. The largest arm suckers possess twelve to fourteen sharp, triangular teeth.

References

Squid
Molluscs described in 2008